Kim-Erik Pedersen (born 26 April 1987 in Hamar, Norway) is a Norwegian artist and jazz musician (saxophone), known from bands like Jon Eberson / Kim-Erik Pedersen Quartet, Eberson Funk Ensemble, Andrea Rydin Berge Quintet and Anja Eline Skybakmoen.

Career 
The versatility of Pedersen has given him many opportunities collaborating within various jazz bands, at clubs and as a soloist with the Symphony Orchestra of Music at the Norwegian Academy of Music in Oslo where he studied music. His talent has also given him the opportunity to perform within several Norwegian bands around on European jazz scenes.

Kim-Erik Pedersen Quartet with Lars Andreas Aspesæter (piano), Lars Egil Reine Hammersbøen (upright bass) and Tore Sandbakken (drums). Off Topic from 2007, a trio with Sebastian Haugen (bass) and Tore Sandbakken. The trio Pedersen/Myhr/Baar including Adrian Myhr (upright bass) and Jon Audun Baar (drums).

Discography 

Trio including Kim Johannesen and Chris Corsano
2011: Door To Door (FMR Records)

Machina trio including with Kristoffer Lo and Trond Bersu
2011: So Much For Dancing (Øra Fonogram)

Bleak House trio including with Dag-Filip Roaldsnes and Tore T. Sandbakken
2012: Dark Poetry (Creative Sources)

References

External links 
Kim-Erik Pedersen at Groove.no

Norwegian jazz saxophonists
Norwegian jazz composers
Norwegian Academy of Music alumni
Musicians from Hamar
1986 births
Living people
21st-century saxophonists